John Wesley Warrington (July 22, 1844 – May 26, 1921) was a United States circuit judge of the United States Court of Appeals for the Sixth Circuit and of the United States Circuit Courts for the Sixth Circuit.

Education and career

Born in Clark County, Ohio, Warrington joined the United States Army during the American Civil War, serving in the 110th Ohio Infantry from 1862 to 1865. He thereafter attended Cincinnati Law School (now the University of Cincinnati College of Law), receiving a Bachelor of Laws in 1869. He worked for the city of Cincinnati, Ohio, as an assistant city solicitor from 1869 to 1873, and then as city solicitor until 1875. He was a Republican Presidential elector for Hayes/Wheeler in 1876. He was in private practice in Cincinnati from 1876 to 1909, during which time he was a professor of equity jurisprudence and trusts at the Cincinnati Law School, from 1901 to 1904. He was president of the Ohio State Bar Association in 1902.

Federal judicial service

Warrington was nominated by President William Howard Taft on March 16, 1909, to a joint seat on the United States Court of Appeals for the Sixth Circuit and the United States Circuit Courts for the Sixth Circuit vacated by Judge John K. Richards. He was confirmed by the United States Senate on March 16, 1909, and received his commission the same day. On December 31, 1911, the Circuit Courts were abolished and he thereafter served only on the Court of Appeals. He assumed senior status on October 6, 1919, becoming the first judge to enter this form of semi-retirement, which had recently been created by statute. His service terminated on May 26, 1921, due to his death in Cincinnati.

References

Sources

External links
 
 

1844 births
1921 deaths
People from Clark County, Ohio
Judges of the United States Court of Appeals for the Sixth Circuit
United States court of appeals judges appointed by William Howard Taft
20th-century American judges
University of Cincinnati College of Law alumni
University of Cincinnati College of Law faculty
People of Ohio in the American Civil War
Ohio Republicans
1876 United States presidential electors